The , formerly known as Sperrgebiet (German, meaning "Prohibited Area"; also known as Diamond Area 1) is a diamond mining area in southwestern Namibia, in the Namib Desert. However, mining only takes place in five percent of the Sperrgebiet, with most of the area acting as a buffer zone. Members of the public are banned from entering most of the area, despite the creation of a national park there in 2004.

History 
In September 1908, the German government created the Sperrgebiet in its colony of German South West Africa, giving sole rights for mining to the Deutsche Diamantengesellschaft ("German Diamond Company"). In 1915, during World War I, South African forces led by General Jan Smuts and Louis Botha, the South African Prime Minister, invaded the country. The South Africans defeated the Germans, taking control of modern-day Namibia, including the Sperrgebiet. The owner of the mine, De Beers, had total control of the area until the 1990s, when the Namibian government purchased a fifty-percent stake. They formed a joint partnership called the Namdeb Diamond Corporation.

Nature 
 

The mining area close to Bogenfels is called "Pocket Beaches" which is one of Namdeb's northern coastal mines. The Sperrgebiet has a diverse range of flora and fauna, due to little human intervention in the area for 100 years. Forty percent of the landscape is desert, thirty percent is grassland, and twenty-eight percent is rocky. The area includes the Tsaus Mountains, Mount Aurus, Mount Heioab, Mount Höchster, the Klinghardt Mountains and the permanent water spring Kaukausib.

There are 776 types of plants in the Sperrgebiet, with 234 being endemic to southwest Namibia, despite the Orange River being the only permanent water supply in the area. A study has shown that climate change will affect the plant life in the area, specifically in the Succulent Karoo. Drier winters may lead to the extinction of these plants, as they are endemic to the Sperrgebiet. According to Morgan Hauptfleisch, a scientist who works at the Southern African Institute for Environmental Assessment, the Sperrgebiet "is the only arid biodiversity hotspot and this makes it a very special area". It has more biodiversity than anywhere else in Namibia, supporting animals such as the gemsbok, springbok, and brown hyena. Bird species resident in the Sperrgebiet include the African oystercatcher, the black-headed canary, and the dune lark.

National park and recent history
The Sperrgebiet was designated as a national park in June 2004, and is now named Tsau ǁKhaeb National Park. De Beers still controls the area, but will relinquish control to the Namibian Ministry for Environment and Tourism once a management plan for the park has been completed. It is also a proclaimed diamond area which needs thorough control so as to keep possible diamond theft at bay. In April 2008, the 500-year-old wreck of a ship named Bom Jesus containing Iberian coins, bronze cannons, copper, and ivory was found in the Sperrgebiet. Under Namibian law, the Namibian government is entitled to all the items found on board. These items will be showcased at a museum in Oranjemund once the museum has been constructed.

There are several ghost towns in the Sperrgebiet, built in the late 19th century, the best known of these being Kolmanskop and others including Pomona and Elizabeth Bay. The wind has partially excavated a number of half-mummified bodies at a graveyard outside one of these ghost towns.

Economic Use 

In 2021, the government of Namibia announced a US$9.4 billion green hydrogen project in the Tsau ǁKhaeb National Park. The plant will ultimately produce 300,000 tons of hydrogen, either as pure green hydrogen or in derivative form (green ammonia). It will be built and operated for 40 years by HYPHEN Hydrogen Energy (Pty) Ltd, a joint venture between Nicholas Holdings Limited and ENERTRAG South Africa (Pty) Ltd. The renewable electricity generation capacity will be 2 GW until 2026 and 5 GW until late 2020s. The investment amount lies in the same order of magnitude like the total GDP of Namibia at time of planning. Nearly 15,000 direct jobs during construction and 3,000 further jobs during operation will be created. More than 90% will be filled by Namibians. According to Raffinetti, the CEO of HYPHEN: "The Tsau ǁKhaeb National Park is among the top 5 locations in the world for low-cost hydrogen production, benefiting from a combination of co-located onshore wind and solar resources near the sea and land export routes to market."

Gallery

References
 Christian Goltz (2012). Sperrgebiet National Park Visitor's Information Materials

Further reading 
 Noli, Gino: Desert Diamonds. Gino Noli, Plettenberg Bay 2010, .

External links 
 

Economy of Namibia
Environment of Namibia
Geology of Namibia
History of Namibia
National parks of Namibia
Protected areas established in 2004
1908 establishments in German South West Africa